The women's 400 metre individual medley event at the 2012 Summer Olympics took place on 28 July at the London Aquatics Centre in London, United Kingdom.

At only 16 years of age, China's Ye Shiwen blasted a new world record to capture the Olympic title in the event. She trailed behind American teenager Elizabeth Beisel more than halfway through the race, before pulling away with a superb freestyle leg to bring home the Olympic gold medal and the world record in a sterling time of 4:28.43. Her spectacular swim also demolished the previous standard from Australia's Stephanie Rice in Beijing four years earlier by more than a second. Meanwhile, Beisel enjoyed the race with a powerful lead on the breaststroke leg, but felt satisfied to claim the silver in 4:31.27. Ye's teammate Li Xuanxu stormed home on the final stretch to grab a bronze in 4:32.91, edging out Hungary's early leader Katinka Hosszú (4:33.49) by more than half a second (0.50).

Great Britain's home favorite Hannah Miley finished fifth in 4:34.17, while Rice, the defending Olympic champion, matched United States' Caitlin Leverenz with an unexpected sixth-place time in 4:35.49. Spain's Mireia Belmonte García rounded out the final roster in 4:35.62.

Records
Prior to this competition, the existing world and Olympic records were as follows.

The following records were established during the competition:

Results

Heats

Final

References

External links
NBC Olympics Coverage

Women's 400 metre individual medley
Olympics
2012 in women's swimming
Women's events at the 2012 Summer Olympics